The Music Box Tour was the debut concert tour in 1993 by American singer-songwriter Mariah Carey, in support of her Diamond-certified third studio album, Music Box (1993). It is Carey's first headlining tour, visiting six cities in the United States. The tour lasted seven shows, starting on November 3, 1993 in Miami, Florida, and ended on December 10, 1993 in New York City.

Background 
Carey did not do a significant amount of public performing in her early years in the music industry, partially due to stage fright. Despite this, she became a successful musician with two top-selling albums and five number-one singles before she ever gave a significant performance before a live audience. Her first significant performance was MTV Unplugged, which received positive reception. In July 1993, she performed before a largely private audience in Proctor's Theatre in Schenectady, New York, which was used for an NBC television special and the Here Is Mariah Carey video release. In late 1993, she decided to conduct a short United States tour to promote her album Music Box, which had been released two months previously. Carey played her first concert tour in arenas, rather than working her way up from smaller venues as is more customary.

Concert synopsis 
The performers took the stage to the recorded music of "They Call the Wind Mariah" from the musical Paint Your Wagon.
The show featured Carey's main collaborator at the time Walter Afanasieff on keyboards along with a band. A gospel choir appeared on a few numbers, a practice that Carey would revive on some future tours. Dancers were present on stage, but Carey did not dance with them, an avoidance she would maintain until doing a little bit of dancing in her 1996 Daydream World Tour. Unlike her future tours, however, Carey kept costume changes to a minimum, with at most one before an encore. The show was about 80 minutes long.

The shows' set list was focused on her hits, with occasional non-singles from her studio albums mixed in. The one new song she introduced was her rendition of The SOS Band's 1983 R&B hit "Just Be Good to Me", which she introduced as "one of my favorite 'old school' songs."

Reception 

Carey's opening concert at the Miami Arena before 15,000 people drew national media attention. Carey later related that "I was OK until I had to walk up this ramp on to the stage and I heard this deafening scream and it was kinda like everything in my life, this whole incredible whirlwind I'd been going through, it had all been leading up to that insane moment and there I was.... And then they killed me. Not the audience – they knew it was my first show, they were very supportive. I got really bad reviews, though. Well, there were a lot of critics out to get me: this girl's sold all these albums, she's never toured, let's get her. So they did. I turned on the TV in bed that night and the CNN guy was saying, 'The reviews are in and it's bad news for Mariah Carey.' It really hurt me a lot."

Carey expressed that she used her anger to improve her next performance at the Worcester Centrum, and got "rave reviews" as a result. The Boston Globe called it "a spectacular performance [which] bowled over the crowd with a confidence that grew before their very eyes", after Carey "shook off her nervousness at the start." Further, her highest-visibility performance in the tour closer at Madison Square Garden in New York City got a very positive review from Jon Pareles of The New York Times, although The Bergen Record gave mixed notices to the sold-out show. But overall the impression was, especially framed by the opening night, that most critics gave negative reviews to the Music Box Tour.
In response, Carey said, "As soon as you have a big success, a lot of people don't like that. There's nothing I can do about it. All I can do is make music I believe in."

Carey would avoid North America on her next two tours, the 1996 Daydream World Tour and the 1998 Butterfly World Tour, and would not tour the continental United States again until seven years later during the 2000 Rainbow World Tour.

Set list 

 "They Call the Wind Mariah" (Introduction)
 "Emotions"
 "Love Takes Time"
 "Now That I Know"
 "Without You"
 "Dreamlover"
 "Someday"
 "I Don't Wanna Cry"
 "Vanishing"
 "Make It Happen"
 "Hero"
 "All in Your Mind"
 "Just Be Good to Me"
 "Good Times (Theme Song)" (Interlude)
 "Anytime You Need a Friend"
 "I'll Be There" (With Trey Lorenz)
 "Vision of Love"
 "Emotions Reprise" (Outro)

Notes:

 "Santa Claus Is Comin' to Town" and ”Dreamlover Remix” were performed in New York City.

Shows

Box office score data

Personnel 
Walter Afanasieff – musical director, piano, organ
Randy Jackson – bass
Ren Klyce – keyboards
Dan Shea – keyboards
Vernon Black – guitar
Gregory "Gigi" Gonoway – drums
Peter Michael – percussion
Melonie Daniels – background vocals
Kelly Price – background vocals
Cheree Price – background vocals
Deborah Cooper – background vocals
Katreese Barnes - background vocals
Trey Lorenz – special guest vocalist

References 

Mariah Carey concert tours
1993 concert tours